East Lynne is a 1916 American silent drama film directed by Bertram Bracken and starring Theda Bara. Produced by Fox Film Corporation, it is an adaptation of the 1861 novel East Lynne by English author Mrs. Henry Wood. A 16mm print of the film was discovered in 1971 and purchased from Fox by the Museum of Modern Art where it is currently preserved. It is one of the few extant films of Theda Bara.

Cast
 Theda Bara as Lady Isabel Carlisle
 Ben Deeley as Archibald Carlisle
 Stuart Holmes as Captain Levison
 Claire Whitney as Barbara Hare
 William H. Tooker as Judge Hare, Barbara's Father
 Loel Steuart as Carlisle Child
 Eldean Stuart as Little William Carlisle
 Eugenie Woodward as Mrs. Hare
 Stanhope Wheatcroft as Richard Hare
 Emily Fitzroy as Cornelia

See also
 List of rediscovered films

References

External links

1916 films
1916 drama films
1910s rediscovered films
Silent American drama films
American silent feature films
American black-and-white films
Films based on British novels
Films set in England
Films produced by William Fox
Fox Film films
Rediscovered American films
Films directed by Bertram Bracken
1910s American films